Choristella ponderi is a species of sea snail, a marine gastropod mollusk in the family Choristellidae.

Description

Distribution
This marine species occurs off New South Wales, Australia.

References

External links
 McLean J.H. (1992). Systematic review of the family Choristellidae (Archeogastropoda: Lepetellacea) with descriptions of new species. The Veliger 35(4): 273-294

Choristellidae
Gastropods described in 1992